Upperchurch is a small village in County Tipperary, Ireland. It lies in the Slievefelim Hills, just off the R503 regional road between Thurles and Limerick. Its Irish name was historically anglicised as Templeoughteragh, Templeoughtragh and Templeoughtera. It is a civil parish in the historical barony of Kilnamanagh Upper.

Sport
Upperchurch–Drombane GAA is the local Gaelic Athletic Association club.
Clodiagh Rangers F.C is the local soccer club.

See also
 List of civil parishes of County Tipperary
 List of towns and villages in the Republic of Ireland

References

External links
  Upperchurch, Drombane and District Development Association
 Upperchurch Settlement Plan

Towns and villages in County Tipperary
Civil parishes of Kilnamanagh Upper